Puja is a worship ritual performed by Hindus, Buddhists and Jains to offer devotional homage and prayer to one or more deities, to host and honor a guest, or to spiritually celebrate an event. It may honor or celebrate the presence of special guests, or their memories after they die. The word pūjā is Sanskrit, and means reverence, honor, homage, adoration, and worship. Puja, the loving offering of light, flowers, and water or food to the divine, is the essential ritual of Hinduism. For the worshipper, the divine is visible in the image, and the divinity sees the worshipper. The interaction between human and deity, between human and guru, is called darshan, seeing.

In Hindu practice, puja is done on a variety of occasions, frequencies, and settings. It may include a daily puja done in the home, or occasional temple ceremonies and annual festivals. In other cases, puja is held to mark a few lifetime events such as the birth of a baby or a wedding, or to begin a new venture. The two main areas where puja is performed are in the home and at temples to mark certain stages of life, events or some festivals such as Durga Puja and Lakshmi Puja. Puja is not mandatory in Hinduism. It may be a routine daily affair for some Hindus, a periodic ritual for some, and rare for other Hindus. In some temples, various pujas may be performed daily at various times of the day; in other temples, they may be occasional.

Puja varies according to the sect, region, occasion, deity honored, and steps followed. In formal Nigama ceremonies, a fire may be lit in honor of the god Agni, without an idol or image present. In contrast, in Agama ceremonies, an idol or icon or image of a deity is present. In both ceremonies, a lamp (Diya) or incense stick may be lit while a prayer is chanted or a hymn is sung. Puja is typically performed by a Hindu worshiper alone, though sometimes in the presence of a priest who is well-versed in complex rituals and hymns. In temples and priest-assisted events puja, food, fruits, and sweets may be included as sacrificial offerings to the ceremony or deity, which, after the prayers, becomes prasad – food shared by all gathered.

Both Nigama and Agama puja are practiced in Hinduism in India. In Hinduism of Bali Indonesia, Agama puja is most prevalent both inside homes and in temples. Puja is sometimes called  Sembahyang in Indonesia.

Etymology

Puja has unclear origins. J. A. B. van Buitenen states that "puja" emerged from yajna rituals, linking it to the Pravargya Vedic rite. The Rigveda in hymn 8.17 uses the word "Sachipujanayam" (शाचिपूजनायं) in the twelfth verse, where it is an epithet for god Indra in a context of vocative singular "praise". The ancient scholar and Vedic text commentator Sāyana explains the term as a form of "praise, worship, invocation". The Grhyasutras use puj in the context of rites, as does Sanskrit scholar Pāṇini. However, none of these texts imply puja as a form of devotional prayer worship.

According to Natalia Lidova, puja is unlikely to be of Indo-Aryan and Vedic origin because it lacks a Sanskrit root and it also lacks cognate parallels in other Indo-European languages. Its root are probably Dravidian in origin, but the evidence for this alternative hypothesis is also largely missing possibly because devotional worship is not as ancient as Hinduism. Collins states that the roots may be "pu" (flower) and "ge" (make), or a form of "making flower sacrifice". However, this proposal is problematic because "pu" comes from an Indo-European root, while "ge" from Dravidian. Charpentier suggests the origin of the word Puja may lie in the Dravidian languages. Two possible Tamil roots have been suggested:  'to smear with something' or  "to do with flowers" (from  'flower' and  'to do'). or similar Telugu roots  (from  'flower' and  'to do').

Origins
According to scholars, one of the earliest mentions of pūjā is in the Grihya Sutras, which provide rules for domestic rites. These Sutras, dated to be about 500 BC, use the term puja to describe the hospitality to honor priests who were invited to one's home to lead rituals for departed ancestors. As with vedic times, the general concept of puja remained the same, but expanded to welcoming the deity along with the deity's spiritual essence as one's honored guest. The Puranic corpus of literature, dating from about 6th century CE, contain extensive outline on how to perform deity puja (deva pūjā). Deity puja thus melds Vedic rites with devotion to deity in its ritual form. As with many others aspects of Hinduism, both Vedic puja and devotional deity puja continued, the choice left to the Hindu.

As a historical practice, pūjā in Hinduism, has been modeled around the idea of hosting a deity, or important person, as an honored and dearest guest in the best way one can, given one's resources, and receiving their happiness and blessing in return. Paul Thieme suggests from passages in the Rāmāyaṇa that the word pūjā referred to the hospitable reception of guests and that the things offered to guests could be offered to the gods and their dwellings. The rituals in question were the "five great sacrifices" or pañcamahāyajña recorded in the Gṛhyasūtra texts (for this literature, see Kalpa). The development of pūjā thus emerged from Vedic domestic traditions and was carried into the temple environment by analogy: just as important guests had long been welcomed in well-to-do homes and offered things that pleased them, so too were the gods welcomed in temple-homes and offered things that pleased them. Copper-plate charters recording grants of lands to temples show that this religious practice was actively encouraged from the mid-4th century.

Significance 
In the earliest texts describing Vedic puja, the significance of puja was to host the priest so that he could make direct requests to the gods. An example petition prayer made during a Vedic puja, according to Wade Wheelock, is:

Indra-Agni, slayers of Vrtra with the beautiful thunderbolt, prosper us with new gifts;
O Indra, bring treasures with your right hand;
O Agni grant the enjoyments of a good household;
Give (us) vigor, wealth in cattle, and possession of good horses.
– ÄsvSü

In contrast to Vedic pujas, the significance of deity pujas shifted from petitions and external goals to the experience of oneness with the deities and their spiritual essence. It became a form of Yoga whose final result aimed to be the consciousness of god through homage to god. Nevertheless, even with this evolved theoretical spiritual significance, for many people, puja continued to be a vehicle to petition desires and appeals, such as for good health of one's child, speedy recovery from illness, success in venture envisioned or such. In the structure and practice of puja, the mantras and rituals focus on spirituality, and any petitions and appeals are tacked only to the end of the puja.

Zimmer relates puja to yantras, with the rituals helping the devotee focus on the spiritual concepts. Puja in Hinduism, claims Zimmer, is a path and process of transformation of consciousness, where the devotee and the spiritual significance of the deity are brought together. This ritual puja process, in different parts of India, is considered to be liberating, releasing, purifying and a form of Yoga of spirit and emotions.

Puja in Hinduism sometimes involves themes beyond idols or images. Even persons, places, rivers, concrete objects or anything is seen as manifestations of divine reality by some Hindus. The access to the divine is not limited to renunciatory meditation as in yoga school of Hinduism or idols in bhakti school. For some the divine is everywhere, without limit to its form, and a puja to these manifestations signifies the same spiritual meaning to those who choose to offer a prayer to persons, places, rivers, concrete objects or anything else.

Temple pūjā

Temple (Mandir) pūjā is more elaborate than the domestic versions and typically done several times a day. They are also performed by a temple priest, or pujari. In addition, the temple deity (patron god or goddess) is considered a resident rather than a guest, so the puja is modified to reflect that; for example the deity is "awakened" rather than "invoked" in the morning. Temple pujas vary widely from region to region and for different sects, with devotional hymns sung at Vaishnava temples for example. At a temple puja, there is often less active participation, with the priest acting on behalf of others.

Structure, services and steps

Elaborate pūjā
A full home or temple puja can include several traditional upacaras or "attendances". The following is an example puja; these steps may vary according to region, tradition, setting, or time particularly in ways the deity is hosted. In this example, the deity is invited as a guest, the devotee hosts and takes care of the deity as an honored guest, hymns and food are offered to the deity, after an expression of love and respect the host takes leave and with affection expresses good bye to the deity. Indologist Jan Gonda has identified 16 steps (shodasha upachara) that are common in all varieties of puja:

 Avahana (“invocation”). The deity is invited to the ceremony from the heart.
 Asana. The deity is offered a seat.
 Padya. The deity's feet are symbolically washed.
 Water is offered for washing the head and body
 Arghya. Water is offered so the deity may wash its mouth.
 Snana or abhisekha. Water is offered for symbolic bathing.
 Vastra (“clothing”). Here a cloth may be wrapped around the image and ornaments affixed to it.
 Upaveeda or Mangalsutra. Putting on the sacred thread.
 Anulepana or gandha. Perfumes and ointments are applied to the image. Sandalwood paste or kumkum is applied.
 Pushpa. Flowers are offered before the image, or garlands draped around its neck.
 Dhupa. Incense is burned before the image.
 Jyot  or Aarti. A burning lamp is waved in front of the image.
 Naivedya. Foods such as cooked rice, fruit, clarified butter, sugar, and betel leaf are offered.
 Namaskara or pranama. The worshipper and family bow or prostrate themselves before the image to offer homage.
 Parikrama or Pradakshina. Circumambulation around the deity.
 Taking leave.

Sometimes additional steps are included:
 Dhyana (“Meditation”). The deity is invoked in the heart of the devotee.
 Acamanıya. Water is offered for sipping.
 Aabaran. The deity is decorated with ornaments.
 Chatram. Offering of umbrella.
 Chamaram Offering of fan or fly-whisk (Chamara).
 Visarjana or Udvasana. The deity is moved from the place.

There are variations in this puja method such as:
 Pancha upachara puja (puja with 5 steps).
 Chatushasti upachara puja (puja with 64 steps).

The structure of elaborate puja also varies significantly between temples, regions, and occasions.

Archana puja is a brief intercessionary puja on behalf of an individual that can be undertaken after the main puja.

Quick pūjā

A quick puja has the same structure as acts people would ordinarily perform for a quick reception, hospitality and affectionate interaction with a beloved guest. First the deity is greeted, acknowledged by name and welcomed, sometimes with a diya or lighted incense stick. The devotee proceeds to connect with the spiritual manifestation by meditating (a form of darshan), or chanting hymns and mantras, then personal prayers follow. After the prayer is finished, the spiritual visitor as the guest is affectionately thanked and greeted goodbye. A quick meditative puja is sometimes offered by some Hindus without an idol or image. According to Chris Fuller, an anthropologist, Hindu texts allow flexibility and abbreviated puja according to the occasion, needs, and personal preferences.

In Balinese Hinduism 

In Hinduism of Bali Indonesia, puja is sometimes called Sembahyang. The word originates from two words in old Javanese: sembah and hyang. Sembah means to respect and bow down; Hyang means divine, God or Sang Hyang Widhi Wasa, holy man, and ancestors. So to pray means to respect, bow down, surrender to the divine and ancestors.

Sembahyang (Puja) is an obligation for Balinese Hindus, the prayers and hymns are derived from the Vedas. A family typically offers prayers every day, with Kewangen and other offerings. Kewangen means aromatic, and it is made from leaves and flowers in form of auspicious Vedic symbols. Balinese use kewangen to worship the divine, both in form of Purusha (soul) and Pradana (body). As with India, Balinese make offerings, including symbolic inclusion of fire, incense and mantras.

Guru puja 
In the case of great spiritual masters, there is also a custom to perform puja for a living person especially in Guru Purnima. Gurus are sometimes chosen as objects of puja and honored as living gods or seen as the embodiment of specific deities. Gurus are sometimes adorned with symbolic clothes, garlands and other ornaments, and celebrated with incense, washing and anointing their feet, giving them fruits, food and drinks and meditating at their feet, asking for their blessing.

As a social and human rights event 
As with church services in Christianity, Pūjā in Hinduism has served as a means for Hindu communities outside India to gather, socialize, discover new friends and sometimes discuss ways to address social discrimination of Hindus. For example, Marion O'Callaghan reports that the Hindu diaspora brought as indentured laborers to Trinidad by the British colonial government, suffered discriminatory laws that did not recognize traditional Hindu marriages or inheritance rights of children from a traditional Hindu marriage, nor did the non-Hindu majority government allow pyre cremation or construction of crematorium. These Hindu rituals were considered pagan and uncivilized. Pujas offered a way for Hindus to meet, socially organize and petition their human rights. Over time, pujas became as much a social and community recreational event as a religious event.

Critique of pūjā in the Pūrva Mīmāṃsaka school

Although pujā is accepted as a valid religious activity by Hindus at large, it has long been criticised by Mīmāṃsā thinkers. The foundational work of this school was the Karmamīmāṃsāsūtra or "Aphorisms for Enquiry into the Act," composed by Jaimini. The earliest surviving commentary was by Śabara who lived around the end of the fourth century. Śabara's commentary, known as Śabarabhāṣya held pride of place in Mīmāṃsā in that Sabara's understanding was taken as definitive by all later writers. In his chapter entitled Devatādikaraṇa (9: 1: 5: 6–9), Śabara examined the popular understanding of the gods and attempted to refute the belief that they have material bodies, are able to eat the offerings made to them, and are capable of being pleased and so able to reward worshippers. Basing himself on the Vedas (he refused to accept the Mahābhārata, Purāṇa texts or even the Smṛti literatures as valid sources of authority), Śabara concluded that the gods are neither corporeal nor sentient and thus unable to enjoy offerings or own property. For this he appealed to empirical observation, noting that offerings do not decrease in size when given to the gods; any decrease is simply due to exposure to the air. Likewise he argued that substances are offered to gods not according to the wishes of the gods, but that "what is vouched for by direct perception is that the things are used according to the wishes of the temple servants (pratyakṣāt pramāṇāt devatāparicārakāṇām abhiprāyaḥ). In the course of his discussion, Śabara's asserted that "there is no relation between the case of guests and the sacrificial act." This incidental remark provided sound historical proof that pūjā was built on analogy with atithi, the ancient Vedic tradition of welcoming guests. What Śabara was maintaining was that this analogy was not valid. While the Mīmāṃsakas continued to maintain this interpretation for centuries, their defeat in debate at the hands of Śaṅkarācārya led to theirs being a minority view. Mīmāṃsakas flourished even into the 17th century, as evidenced by the commentaries of Nīlakaṇṭha.

Regional names
Puja is called   in Tamil, bucha in Thai, and sometimes also   in Bengali.

See also 

 Añjali Mudrā
 Buddhist prayer beads
 Coconut: use for worship
 Culture of India
 Dhupa
 Guru-shishya tradition
 Hindu iconography
 Hindu prayer beads
 Hindu temple
 Homa (ritual)
 Indian honorifics
 Mala
 List of Hindu festivals, many of which involve Puja
 List of materials used in Hinduism
 Mudras
 Namaste
 Panchalinga Darshana
 Pranāma
 Prasada
 Puja (Buddhism)
 Pādodaka
 Sacred food as offering
 Satyanarayan Puja
 Seven stages of Yoga
 Tapas (Indian religions)
 The Archaeology of Hindu Ritual
 Worship in Hinduism
 Yajna

References

External links 

 Puja, Expressions of Hindu Devotion, Susan S. Bean, Museum Anthropology, Volume 21, Issue 3, pages 29–32, December 1997

 
Hindu practices
Hindu rituals
Honor
Yoga